Raphitoma symmetrica is an extinct species of sea snail, a marine gastropod mollusc in the family Raphitomidae.

Description

Distribution
Fossils of this extinct marine species were found in Miocene strata on Martinique.

References

 Cossmann (M.), 1913 Étude comparative de fossiles miocéniques recueillis à la Martinique et à l'Isthme de Panama. Journal de Conchyliologie, t. 61, vol. 1, p. 1-64

symmetrica
Gastropods described in 1846